Jorge Benítez (also known as George Benitez) is an American former soccer forward.  He played in both the American Soccer League and the North American Soccer League.  He also earned two caps with the U.S. national team in 1972.

Professional career
Benitez played at least two seasons in the American Soccer League.  He was second in league scoring with 21 goals while with the Ukrainian Nationals during the 1965-1966 season.  In the 1966-1967 season, he led the league in scoring with 16 goals.  He then scored seven goals with the Boston Tigers during the 1967-1968 ASL season before jumping to the Los Angeles Wolves of the North American Soccer League.  The Wolves folded at the end of the season and Benitez moved to the Kansas City Spurs for the 1969 season.  He was the second leading scorer with fifteen goals in fourteen games as the Spurs won the league championship.

National team
Benitez earned two caps with the U.S. national team.  Both came in World Cup qualification losses to Mexico in 1972.  The first was a 3-1 loss on September 3 and the second was a 2-1 loss a week later.

References

External links
 NASL stats

American soccer players
American Soccer League (1933–1983) players
Boston Tigers players
Kansas City Spurs players
Los Angeles Wolves players
North American Soccer League (1968–1984) players
Peruvian emigrants to the United States
Philadelphia Ukrainian Nationals players
United States men's international soccer players
Living people
Association football forwards
Year of birth missing (living people)